Tropolis is a fruit purée that was introduced by Tropicana Products in 2010. It began limited circulation in late January 2011 with full circulation occurring in 2012.

Information
Tropolis was introduced in December 2010 by Tropicana Products. It is an  fruit puree that is sold in pouches. The target audience is mothers and children. Initially, it will be rolled out in the Midwest as a trial market and sales will be expanded if the trial proves successful. Researchers who developed the drink worked with mothers and children to develop a texture of the drink that would flow through the pouch opening. The thickness of the drink was created by adjusting the mix of juice without the addition of gums or starches. The aim of the product, according to PepsiCo, is to get more fruit in the diet of children. The drink is part of the company's "good-for-you" portfolio, which seeks to unite Tropicana, Quaker, and Gatorade brands under one umbrella. PepsiCo Chairman and Chief Executive Indra Nooyi sees the emergence of a market to "snackify" drinks and "drinkify" snacks as a new frontier of sorts in convenience.

Criticism
New York University professor of nutrition  Marion Nestle has noted that the product is not as healthy as pure fruit, saying, "They start out with real food, so let's give them credit for applesauce and mashed-up bananas...the rest of it is sugar. Kids would be better off eating an apple or a banana." She has also indicated that the fruit concentrates are just sugar.
A 3-part "Penny Arcade" strip showed Tycho criticizing Tropolis, saying, "What kind of fucking supervillain comes up with this shit?!" after which a fictitious "Origins" story for the product was shown, depicting an evil scientist setting out to "drinkify" snacks and ending up as a snack himself.

References

External links
 Tropicana Introduces Tropicana Tropolis(TM) to Squeeze More Fruit into Kids' Daily Diets on PepsiCo press release (archived, 25 Dec 2010)

Products introduced in 2010
PepsiCo brands
Tropicana Products